Anselmo Marzato, O.F.M. Cap. (1543–1607) was a Roman Catholic cardinal.

Biography
On 24 Feb 1607, he was consecrated bishop Pope Paul V, with Ludovico de Torres, Archbishop of Monreale, with Marcello Lante della Rovere, Bishop of Todi, serving as co-consecrators.

References

1543 births
1607 deaths
People from Monopoli
17th-century Italian cardinals
Capuchin bishops
17th-century Italian Roman Catholic archbishops